Tritonia pustulosa is a species of dendronotid nudibranch. It is a marine gastropod mollusc in the family Tritoniidae.

References

Tritoniidae
Gastropods described in 1853